, , is a Japanese-American spectroscopist and astronomer specializing in the field of galactic astronomy, known as a pioneer of astrochemistry and the co-discoverer of interstellar trihydrogen cation.
He is now R.A. Milliken Distinguished Service Emeritus Professor, Departments of Astronomy and Astrophysics, Chemistry; Enrico Fermi Institute; and the College of University of Chicago.

Education
Oka received his BS and PhD degrees in 1955 and 1960, respectively, at the University of Tokyo.

Career
From 1960 to 1963, Oka was a JSPS Fellow at the University of Tokyo, and in 1963, he was a postdoctoral fellow along with Harry Kroto and J.K.G.Watson, among others, in Gerhard Herzberg's spectroscopy laboratory at the National Research Council of Canada. Afterward, he successively worked at the National Research Council of Canada (1964-1981), and at the University of Chicago (1981-). His research group is concerned with the study of the quantum mechanics and dynamics of fundamental molecular ions and their behavior in astronomical objects.

Since then Oka and his colleagues have published numerous papers on their observations of interstellar .

Recognition
Oka was on the list of ChemBank's prediction for the 2015 Nobel Prize in Chemistry.

Awards
2004 - Davy Medal.
2004 - Norman MacLean Faculty Award.
2002 - E. Bright Wilson Award in Spectroscopy
1998 - Ellis R. Lippincott Award.
1997 - William F. Meggers Award.
1990 - Burlington Northern Achievement Award.
1982 - Earle K. Plyler Prize for Molecular Spectroscopy
1973 - Steacie Prize.

Titles
2004 - Wei Lun Visiting Professorship.
2004 - Honorary DSc from the University College London.
2003 - Earl W. McDaniel Lecture Georgia Institute of Technology.
2001 - Honoris caua, University of Waterloo.
2000 - George Pimentel Memorial Lecture, University of California, Berkeley.
1998 - Medaili Jana Marca Marci.
1997 - Distinguished JILA Visitor.
1995 - Golden Jubilee Lecture, Tata Institute of Fundamental Research.
1992 - Special Issue, Journal of Molecular Spectroscopy, Vol. 153.
1992 - Lecturer, International School of Physics, "Enrico Fermi".
1992 - Lord Lecturer, Massachusetts Institute of Technology.
1989 - McDowell Lecturer, University of British Columbia.
1985-1986 - Chancellor's Distinguished Lecturer, University of California, Berkeley.
1981-1982 - Centenary Lecturer, Royal Society.

Membership in learned societies
Fellow, American Academy of Arts and Sciences
Fellow, American Physical Society
Fellow, Optical Society of America
Fellow, Royal Society of London
Fellow, Royal Society of Canada

Publications

See also
 List of Fellows of the Royal Society M,N,O
 List of Fellows of the Royal Society elected in 1984

References

External links 
 Chemistry Department - University of Chicago
Journal of Physical Chemistry Takeshi Oka Festschrift: Celebrating 45 Years of Astrochemistry
 シカゴ大学岡武史教授、所長特別セミナーにて講演 | 分子科学研究所

1932 births
Living people
People from Tokyo
University of Chicago faculty
Fellows of the American Academy of Arts and Sciences
Fellows of the Royal Society
21st-century American chemists
Japanese chemists
University of Tokyo alumni
Japanese emigrants to the United States
American academics of Japanese descent
Fellows of the Royal Society of Canada
Fellows of the American Physical Society